The Congo shrews, members of the genus Congosorex, are mammals in the family Soricidae. The genus contains these species:

Phillips's Congo shrew, C. phillipsorum
Greater Congo shrew, C. polli
Lesser Congo shrew, C. verheyeni

References

 
Taxonomy articles created by Polbot